Phoque was a  built for the French Navy in the mid-1920s. Laid down in May 1924, it was launched in March 1926 and commissioned in May 1928. In April 1941, it was disarmed at Bizerte, Tunisia and captured there by the Italians on 8 December 1942 and renamed FR 111. It was sunk on 28 February 1943 10 miles off Murro di Porco, Sicily by Allied aircraft.

Design
Propulsion while surfaced was provided by two  diesel motors and two  electric motors.

Construction and career
Phoque was laid down at the Brest Arsenal on 21 May 1924, launched on 16 March 1926 and commissioned on 7 May 1928. In April 1941, it was disarmed at Bizerte, Tunisia and captured there by the Italians on 8 December 1942 and renamed FR 111. It was sunk on 28 February 1943 10 miles off Murro di Porco, Sicily by Allied aircraft.

Citations

References 

World War II submarines of France
Requin-class submarines
Submarines sunk by aircraft
World War II shipwrecks in the Mediterranean Sea
Ships sunk by US aircraft